The Shadow Men is a 1997 science-fiction thriller directed by Timothy Bond, and starring Eric Roberts, Sherilyn Fenn and Brendan Ryan Barrett.

Plot
A married couple, Bob and Dez Wilson, and their 12-year-old son Andy are being accosted by a blinding light when driving home from a daytrip. They wake up a couple of hours later seemingly unscathed but soon experience recurring nightmares.

It seems that they have been abducted by aliens, as is later proved by their son's Andy's handycam that had suddenly started running right after the incident. This is also discovered by mysterious Men In Black who start nagging the family up to the point of threatening to kill them. As they are laughed at by the police they seek refuge at SciFi-writer Stan Mills' house and start fighting back.

Reception 
"In contrast to the glossy comedy Men in Black that came out the same year, The Shadow Men is a relatively serious depiction of the legendary conspirators", according to The Encyclopedia of Science Fiction online.

Cast

 Eric Roberts as Bob Wilson
 Sherilyn Fenn as Dez Wilson
 Brendan Ryan Barrett as Andy Wilson
 Dean Stockwell as Stan Mills
 Andrew Prine as MIB #1
 Chris McCarty as MIB #2
 Tom Poster as MIB #3
 Valerie Swift as Jane
 Lisa Dinkins as the police Desk Sergeant

References 

1997 films
1990s science fiction films
Films directed by Timothy Bond
American science fiction thriller films
1990s American films

External links